Emerson Seville Woelffer (July 27, 1914 – February 2, 2003) was an American artist and arts educator. He was known as a prominent abstract expressionist artist and painter and taught art at some of the most prestigious colleges and universities. Woelffer was one of the important people in bringing modernism to Los Angeles, when he taught at Chouinard Art Institute.

Biography 
Woelffer was born July 27, 1914 in Chicago, Illinois. He studied at the Art Institute of Chicago between 1935 and 1937, with László Moholy-Nagy.

In 1938 he joined the WPA Arts Program. After serving in the US Air Force, from 1942 until 1949, he taught at Art Institute of Chicago. At the request of Buckminster Fuller, in 1949 he taught at Black Mountain College. In 1954 he taught at the Colorado Springs Fine Arts Center.

In 1959 he and his wife Dina moved to Los Angeles, California where they settled down in the Mount Washington neighborhood. From 1959 to 1973 he taught at the Chouinard Art Institute (now known as California Institute of the Arts) in Valencia, California.

From 1974 and 1992 he taught at The Otis Art Institute (now called Otis College of Art and Design) in Los Angeles, serving as Chair of the Painting Department from 1974 to 1978. In 1991 he received an Honorary Doctorate Degree from Otis College of Art and Design in Los Angeles. He felt such a strong attachment to Otis that he left his estate to the college in the form of an endowment, to set up a scholarship fund to benefit future artists.

Emerson Woelffer is best known for his boldly colored abstract paintings and collages with jagged forms. He also created sculpture and lithographs. Late in his career―suffering from macular degeneration―he began working in white crayon on black paper.

He died in Los Angeles, California in 2003.

Emerson Woelffer's work is held in many public museum collections including at Colorado Springs Fine Arts Center, Honolulu Museum of Art, the Montana Historical Society (Helena, Montana), Museum of Art (Brigham Young University, Provo, Utah), Museum of Contemporary Art San Diego, Neuberger Museum of Art, Oklahoma City Museum of Art, Portland Art Museum, San Diego Museum of Art, Yellowstone Art Museum (Billings, Montana), Asheville Art Museum, Black Mountain College Museum + Art Center, and San Francisco Museum of Modern Art (SFMoMA).

Personal life 
In 1945 he married Dina Anderson, a photographer. Woelffer’s wife, Dina, died in 1990 and he married Marilu Lopez in 1996.

Awards and fellowships
 1967 – Guggenheim Fellowship, Field of Study: Fine Arts (used for travel to Paris)
 1974 – Artist Grant, National Endowment for the Arts (NEA)
 1984 – Pollock–Krasner Grant
 1988 – Francis J. Greenburger Award (in conjunction with the Guggenheim Museum, New York City)
 1991 – Honorary Doctorate Degree, Otis College of Art and Design

Further reading
 Marika Herskovic, American Abstract Expressionism of the 1950s An Illustrated Survey, (New York School Press, 2003.) 
 Woelffer, Emerson, "At the Center + At the Edge, Curated by Brian Butler", Asheville, North Carolina, Black Mountain College Museum + Arts Center, 2008.
 Woelffer, Emerson, Emerson Woelffer, A Solo Flight, Curated by Ed Ruscha, Valencia, California, California Institute of the Arts, 2003.
 Woelffer, Emerson, Emerson Woelffer, Profile of the Artist, 1947-1981, Fullerton, California, California State University, 1982.
 Woelffer, Emerson, A Modernist Odyssey: Fifty Years of Works on Paper, Los Angeles, California, Otis College of Art and Design, 1982.

References

External links
 Interview of Emerson Woelffer, part of Los Angeles Art Community - Group Portrait interview series, Center for Oral History Research, UCLA Library Special Collections, University of California, Los Angeles.

20th-century American painters
20th-century American male artists
American male painters
21st-century American painters
21st-century American male artists
Modern painters
School of the Art Institute of Chicago alumni
Artists from Chicago
American people of German descent
1914 births
2003 deaths
People from Mount Washington, Los Angeles